John Latenser Sr. (1858–1936) was an American architect whose influential public works in Omaha, Nebraska, numbered in the dozens. His original name was Johann Laternser.

Many of the buildings Latenser designed, including public and private, are included on the National Register of Historic Places. In the 1930s 89 out of 98 blocks in Downtown Omaha contained at least one building designed by Latenser and Sons. Latenser designed more than a dozen buildings that are currently included on the National Register of Historic Places.

Biography

Born in Nendeln, Liechtenstein, to a family of people in the construction business, Latenser studied architecture at the Polytechnic College in Stuttgart, Germany, which is now the University of Stuttgart. After 1873 he took a job as a caretaker in his brother Heinrich’s business in what is now Strasbourg, France, at that time Strassburg, provincial capital of the German province of Alsace-Lorraine. It is not known precisely when he immigrated to the United States.

He worked as a draftsman in Chicago, Illinois, for seven years before starting his own architectural firm in Omaha, Nebraska, in 1887. Latenser became staff architect for the Omaha School District in 1892 and was responsible for
the design of at least 20 of the city's public school facilities. His sons, John Jr. and Frank, later joined him in this firm, Latenser & Sons, which designed several prominent buildings in the Midwestern United States.

Career
Many of Latenser's works are still standing today and include the Douglas County Courthouse, the Omaha Central High School, Long School, Saunders School, Columbian School, and the Center School buildings, the Keeline Building, the Eggerss-O'Flyng Building in Omaha and the Blair High School building in Blair, Nebraska. These and many other buildings Latenser designed are listed on the United States  National Register of Historic Places.

Other notable works are at the University of Nebraska at Lincoln, where he was responsible for designing the Temple building, a nursing dormitory at the Medical School, and the Memorial Stadium, as well as the Schulte Field House. Latenser also designed several buildings in Omaha's historic districts, including the South Omaha Main Street Historic District and the now-demolished Jobbers Canyon Historic District.

See also
Thomas Rogers Kimball
Architecture in Omaha, Nebraska
Architecture in North Omaha, Nebraska
 List of public schools in Omaha, Nebraska
 Omaha Landmarks
 Eugene C. Eppley Administration Building

References

1858 births
1936 deaths
Architects from Nebraska
Architects from Chicago
Artists from Omaha, Nebraska
Liechtenstein emigrants to the United States